Mohan Kan (born September 6, 1991) is a sprinter from Bangladesh. He came 5th in Heat 1 of the 100 metres Preliminaries at the 2012 Summer Olympics and did not advance to the first round but did set a personal best time of 11.25 seconds.

References

External links
 
 

1991 births
Living people
Bangladeshi male sprinters
Athletes (track and field) at the 2012 Summer Olympics
Olympic athletes of Bangladesh